Drysdalia mastersii, also known as Masters' snake, is a species of venomous snake endemic to southern Australia. The specific epithet mastersii honours Australian zoologist George Masters who collected specimens for Krefft.

Description
The snake grows to an average of about 40 cm in length. The upper body is light brown to dark grey, with a pale band over the nape and a white stripe extending from the upper lip to the neck.

Behaviour
The species is viviparous, with an average litter size of three. Its diet consists mainly of lizards.

Distribution and habitat
The species’ distribution extends eastwards from near Esperance in Western Australia into coastal and subcoastal South Australia, as well as in south-eastern South Australia and western Victoria. It inhabits heathland, grassland and mallee habitats on sandy and limestone soils. The type locality is the Flinders Ranges of South Australia.

References

External Links

 

mastersii
Snakes of Australia
Reptiles of South Australia
Reptiles of Victoria (Australia)
Reptiles of Western Australia
Taxa named by Gerard Krefft
Reptiles described in 1866